Umeed Ali Junejo, sometimes spelled as Umaid or Umed Ali Junejo, is a village in Sindh, Pakistan. It is located 14 kilometers to the north of Shahdadkot.

Incidents

2010 floods

All of the villages and nearby areas were destroyed.

2022 floods
Likewise 2010 floods, the village is submerged by water.

See also
Umid Ali Junejo railway station
Shahdadkot
 Garhi Khairo

References

External links
 https://pk.geoview.info/zip/77306_umed_ali_junejo

Villages in Sindh
Qambar Shahdadkot District